Pakch'ŏn station was a railway station in Pakch'ŏn-ŭp, Pakch'ŏn County, North P'yŏngan Province, North Korea. It was the terminus of the Pakch'ŏn Line of the Korean State Railway.

History
The station was originally opened on 10 December 1926 by the Chosen Government Railway, at the same time as the rest of the line from Maengjungri to Pakch'ŏn.

References

 Japanese Government Railways (1937), 鉄道停車場一覧. 昭和12年10月1日現在 (The List of the Stations as of 1 October 1937), Kawaguchi Printing Company, Tokyo, p508

Railway stations in North Korea